Clarisse Iribagiza (born 28 January 1988) is a computer scientist in Rwanda. She is the CEO and co-founder of the mobile technology company HeHe Limited and she is one of the UNCTAD's seven "eTrade for Women Advocates from the developing world". She was previously the winner of the East African entrepreneur reality TV show Inspire Africa Season 1.

Biography
Iribagiza attended the University of Rwanda’s College of Science and Technology and she attended a short Massachusetts Institute of Technology (MIT) incubation program.

She founded her company whilst still an under graduate. Her company has grown to have two million customers. The company works with local suppliers and they get access to an on-line store for their goods, inventory maintenance and they receive digital payments from their end customers. HeHe Labs has partnered with GirlHub in an initiative that aims to inspire ambition in Rwandan girls. They teach them about not just ICT, but technology and design in general and in critical thinking.

Iribagiza was one of the "20 movers and shakers of Africa" named at the continent CEO Summit in 2012 and the following year Jeannette Kagame, the First Lady of Rwanda recognised her as one of the Imbuto Foundation's "Celebrating Young Rwandan Achievers".

In 2017 she was named as one of OkayAfrica's 100 Women. Irabagiza sits on the African Development Bank's Presidential Youth Advisory Group.

On 24 September 2019 the United Nations Conference on Trade and Development announced seven "eTrade for Women Advocates" from the developing world. Irabagiza was named and the others were Nina Angelovska, Nazanin Daneshvar, Xiaofei Yao, Patricia Zoundi Yao, Claudia de Heredia and Helianti Hilman. It was announced on the periphery of the United Nations General Assembly in New York but Irabagiza was one of two who did not attend the award ceremony.

Other awards
 Forbes Africa's 30 Under 30 for 2015
 An Italian think tank, LSDP (Lo Spazio della Politica) named Iribagiz among their top 100 global thinkers.

References

Living people
Rwandan businesspeople
1988 births
Rwandan women
Computer scientists